Abdul Jabbar Ahmad Abdul Wahab Numan (1949–2019) was an Arab artist of Yemen, who specialised in the field of plastic art in realist style.

Biography 
Numan was born in Dhoban near the city of Taiz, where he began his studies and then completed in Aden. He then travelled to Cairo where he joined the Italian Art Institute, where he earned a bachelor's degree with distinction in 1973.

At the start of his career, Numan painted in a realist style. His works were associated with the local environment, and expressed identity through architecture and decoration often. Later he  painted women's faces and portraits, highlighting the aesthetics of costume and folklore.

References 

1949 births
2019 deaths
Arab artists
Yemeni artists